Andrew Ford Valentino Espiritu (born July 30, 1967) is a Filipino rapper, record producer, actor, toy collector and comedian. He is considered as the Godfather of Pinoy Rap. He is best known in the Philippines for his 1990 debut hit single "Humanap Ka Ng Panget" (Look For Someone Ugly). Andrew E. won a 'Rap Album of the Year' award for his latest album Clubzilla at the 2010 PMPC Star Awards for Music. His latest single is "Shoot Shoot Part 2" which later used as instrumental for campaign jingle "Heto Na Inday Sara."

Career
Espiritu first worked as a DJ in a popular club, Euphoria and was discovered by guitarman Ramon "RJ" Jacinto in 1991. He made his television debut on That's Entertainment, a variety show hosted by the late German Moreno on GMA-7. He eventually started his professional career in December 1990 when he released his debut single "Humanap Ka ng Panget".

Andrew's career branched out as he began to star in comedy films based on his songs.

In mid-1997, Espiritu founded an independent rap label named Dongalo Wreckords for the purpose of discovering and producing new rap talents, one of them being the rap group Salbakuta, with their debut single "S2upid Luv" becoming a best-seller and spawning a film starring Espiritu. He also runs the rap scene in Dongalo Wreckords, using the pseudonym "Pooch".

Espiritu spent some time in Japan in the late 1990s, performing in clubs and eventually releasing a CD single with two rap songs in Japanese about the misadventures of a tourist in Tokyo.

In 2000, he was a consultant to Caloocan mayor Rey Malonzo "for entertainment and cultural affairs".

On March 25, 2002. he released the album "Porno Daw"

In 2010, he was one of the judges in ABS-CBN's noontime variety/talent show Showtime. He later returned as a judge in the Showtime segment "Hype Best".

He has notably collaborated with Sharon Cuneta, Willie Revillame, Joey de Leon, Regine Velasquez, Francis M., Ogie Alcasid, Janno Gibbs, Carlos Agassi, Death Threat, Salbakuta, DJs such as DJ Coki of Wil Time Big Time, DJ MOD of Showtime and DJ Belal of New York, and actresses such as Maricel Soriano, Ana Roces, Nanette Medved, Charlene Gonzalez, Vina Morales, Sheryl Cruz, Gelli de Belen, Alice Dixson, Amanda Page, Rufa Mae Quinto, Donita Rose and Rica Peralejo.

Espiritu returned to acting in 2016 as Uge, the biological father of Serena (played by Liza Soberano) in ABS-CBN's drama series Dolce Amore.

Andrews first Star Cinema movie was "Raketeros", a comedy movie was released in 2013 for the film company's 20th anniversary of Star Cinema and ABS-CBN Film Productions.

Andrew returns to big screen via a newest wackiest comedy film Sanggano, Sanggago't Sanggwapo, marking his returning to Viva Films since his last film was AB Normal College was released in 2004. Sanggano, Sanggago't Sanggwapo was released in theaters in September 2019, with co stars Dennis Padilla, Janno Gibbs, Louise Delos Reyes and Eddie Garcia with Al Tantay as director.

Controversies

Allegations of plagiarism
In 2018, Espiritu became involved in a plagiarism controversy when "Humanap Ka Ng Panget" was accused of being an unauthorized translation of the song "Find An Ugly Woman" by DJ Cash Money and MC Marvelous. A thread in the /r/Philippines subreddit called out the rapper for allegedly making a cover of "Find An Ugly Woman" without Cash Money Marvelous' permission, just after the noontime variety show ASAP aired a tribute performance to Espiritu.

Personal life
Espirutu married Mylene Espiritu in March 2000. The couple have three children.

Filmography

Film

Television

Discography

Singles

1990 - "Humanap Ka ng Panget"
1990 - "Ize Ba Tayo Dyan?"
1990 - "Wag Kang Gamol"
1991 - "Mas Gusto Mo Siya"
1991 - "Mahal Kita"
1991 - "Bini B. Rocha"
1991 - "Andrew Ford Medina"
1992 - "Mahirap Maging Pogi"
1992 - "Alabang Girls"
1993 - "Manchichiritchit"
1994 - "Ang Boyfriend Kong Gamol" (featuring Alice Dixson)
1994 - "Ikaw ang Miss Universe ng Buhay Ko"
1995 - "Banyo Queen"
1995 - "Akala Ko" (duet with Sharon Cuneta)
1995 - "Bikini Watch"
1995 - "Hibangers"
1996 - "Neber-2-Geder"
1997 - "Where the Girls Are"
1999 - "Maggy"
1999 - "Rubber Dickey"
1999 - "Babala" as Pooch
2000 - "Kagat ng Aso" (Dog bite)
2001 - "Sinabmarin"
2002 - "ShaNaNa"
2003 - "Honey"
2004 - "Shoot Shoot"
2004 - "Pink Palaka"
2004 - "That's Why I Love You" (with Regine Velasquez)
2005 - "Banyo Queen 2"
2006 - "Clean"
2008 - "Ikaw" (Humanap Ka ng Panget Part 2)
2010 - "Sophisitkado" (PMPC Winner/Rap Album of the Year)
2010 - "Danz Now" (with Bugoy na Koykoy and Anne Jameo)
2010 - "A.N.D.R.E.W.F.O.R.D"
2013 - "Ayokong Magtiis Ka" (Niloko si Mark Nievera)
2013 - "I Wish I Can" (with Bastee)
2016 - "Neng, Ikaw Ba Yan?" (with Damuho Skwad)
2020 - "Huwag Kang Gamol" (2020 Remix)
2020 - "Tamang-tama"
2021 - "Shoot-Shoot" (Part 2)

Awards and nominations

References

External links

1967 births
Living people
20th-century Filipino male actors
Bicolano actors
Bicolano people
Filipino male comedians
Filipino male film actors
20th-century Filipino male singers
Filipino male television actors
Filipino rappers
Filipino television personalities
Musicians from Metro Manila
People from Camarines Sur
People from Naga, Camarines Sur
People from Parañaque
Pop rappers
Sampling controversies
Viva Artists Agency
Viva Records (Philippines) artists
21st-century Filipino male singers